Hilliard may refer to:

Places

Canada
Hilliard, Ontario
Hilliard, Alberta

United States
Hilliard, Florida
Hilliard, Missouri
Hilliard, Ohio

Other uses
Hilliard (name)
The Hilliard Ensemble, named after Nicholas Hilliard
Hilliard Mills, historic mill site in Manchester, Connecticut

See also 
 Hilliards (disambiguation)